Graham John Filby (born 29 May 1970) is a South African professional darts player.

Career
Filby won three matches in reaching the final of the South African qualifier for the 2014 PDC World Championship, where he lost 9–3 against Devon Petersen. In June 2014, Filby and Petersen teamed up to represent South Africa at the World Cup of Darts. They averaged 97.40 in a doubles match 5–3 win over Germany in the first round and then beat Singapore to face the number one seeds of Phil Taylor and Adrian Lewis in the quarter-finals. Petersen lost 4–3 to Taylor, meaning Filby had to win his match against Lewis to send the tie into a deciding doubles contest, but he was beaten 4–2.

Filby entered PDC Qualifying School in 2015 and, despite reaching the last 32 on the first day, he could not advance past the last 128 in the last three days to fall short of earning a tour card. At the World Cup, Filby and Petersen survived a match dart from Finland to win 5–4 before losing their singles matches against Michael van Gerwen and Raymond van Barneveld of the Netherlands in the second round. In the 2016 event they were defeated 5–1 by Singapore.

References

External links

1970 births
Living people
People from Beaufort West
South African darts players
White South African people
Professional Darts Corporation associate players
PDC World Cup of Darts South African team
Sportspeople from the Western Cape